The Curtiss Model 22 Cox Racers were two specialised racing aircraft built by the American Curtiss Aeroplane and Motor Company. The type was flown as a monoplane, biplane and triplane.

Design and development
In 1920 the American oil millionaire S.Cox had two specialised racing monoplanes built for him by the Curtiss Aeroplane and Motor Company to take part in the Gordon Bennett Trophy race to be held in France in September 1920. The two aircraft, named Texas Wildcat and Cactus Kitten, were single-engined, braced, high-wing monoplanes powered by a  Curtiss C-12 inline piston engine. They had streamlined wooden fuselages with the pilot sitting in an enclosed cockpit towards the rear of the fuselage, under a forward sliding canopy. The wing, which had a special double camber airfoil section,  was high-mounted, and was braced by struts to the mainwheels of the fixed conventional landing gear. The V-12 engine drove a two-bladed tractor propeller, and was cooled by radiators mounted on the side of the fuselage between the cockpit and the wings.

Operational history
The Texas Wildcat was briefly tested in the United States before shipment, being fitted with a different wing with a more conventional airfoil for operation out of the confined Curtiss Field. Both aircraft were then sent by ship to France, with no testing carried out on the high speed wing and Cactus Kitten unflown before sailing. Texas Wildcat was reassembled at the Morane-Saulnier factory with the high speed wing, but was found to be unstable at high speeds when flown by test pilot Roland Rohlfs. A set of biplane wings were therefore quickly designed and fitted to Texas Wildcat. Texas Wildcat was wrecked in a landing accident when being flown to Étampes prior to the race.

Although the Cactus Kitten was taken to France it remained unflown and was returned to the United States. It was then rebuilt with a set of short-span triplane wings modified from those of a Curtiss 18T, with the enclosed cockpit replaced by a more conventional open cockpit. It was later sold to the United States Navy as a trainer for high-speed racing aircraft.

Specifications (Cactus Kitten)

References

Notes

Bibliography

 

High-wing aircraft
Single-engined tractor aircraft
1920s United States sport aircraft
Cox
Racing aircraft
Aircraft first flown in 1920